Divoš is a village in Croatia. It is connected by the D518 highway. Bobota Canal passes next to the village.

References

Populated places in Osijek-Baranja County